The Diocese of Agder og Telemark is a diocese of the Church of Norway, covering all of Agder county and most of Vestfold og Telemark county in Norway.  The cathedral city is Kristiansand, Norway's fifth largest city. Kristiansand Cathedral serves as the seat of the presiding Bishop. The bishop since 2013 has been Stein Reinertsen. As of 1 January 2003, there were 347,324 members of the Church of Norway in the diocese.

History
In 1125, the southern part of the Ancient Diocese of Bergen was split off as the Ancient Diocese of Stavanger. This new diocese stretched from the coast of Haugesund in the west to Gjernestangen between Risør and Kragerø, later the border stretched to Eidanger in the east. Stavanger was the cathedral city.  During the Protestant Reformation, Norway became a Lutheran nation, establishing the Church of Norway.  The diocesan boundaries remained the same.

Over time, however, the diocese was reduced in size.  The parish of Eidfjord was transferred to the neighboring Diocese of Bjørgvin in 1630. The regions of Valdres and Hallingdal were transferred to the Diocese of Oslo in 1631, but in exchange, the Diocese of Oslo had to give the upper part of Telemark and transfer that to the Diocese of Stavanger.

In 1682 Christian V, King of Denmark-Norway, issued an order that the Bishop and the Prefect of the Diocese of Stavanger were to be moved to the Christianssand Cathedral, which had been consecrated in 1646 and which the King intended be perfect site for a new cathedral. The citizens of Stavanger protested, with the Prefect and the Bishop refusing to move and ignoring the order. It took two years before Christianssand was established as the new cathedral city. The diocese was renamed Diocese of Christianssand.

On 1 January 1925, the Diocese of Kristiansand was divided and all of the diocese located in Rogaland county was moved to the newly re-established Diocese of Stavanger and the Stavanger Cathedral regained its place as the seat of a bishop. The remainder of the diocese was renamed "Diocese of Agder" and it continued to serve the counties of Aust-Agder, Vest-Agder, and Telemark. In 2005 the diocese was renamed again as the "Diocese of Agder og Telemark" to fully reflect the areas included in the diocese.

Kristiansand Cathedral

Kristiansand Cathedral is the headquarters of the Diocese of Agder and Telemark and it is the main parish church for the city of Kristiansand. In 1682, there was a small church built of wood on site in Kristiansand. A new cathedral was built of stone and consecrated by Bishop Hans Munch in 1696, but burned down in 1734. The city's second cathedral was consecrated in 1738 by Bishop Jacob Kærup. This cathedral was destroyed in the city fire of 1880.

The present church is the third cathedral in the city and the fourth church in the town square in Kristiansand. The church was built after a drawing by the architect Henrik Thrap-Meyer. The church is described as neo-gothic style. The Cathedral has a beautiful wooden ceiling and six beautiful stained glass windows with Biblical themes.

In order to exploit the ancient walls of the church that burned in 1880, the altar was placed against the west, while the churches generally tend to have the altar in the east. Building work was completed on 1 February 1885. The church was consecrated on 18 March 1885 with Johan M. Brun as acting bishop.

Structure
The diocese is administratively divided into 9 deaneries spread out over two counties. Each deanery corresponds to one or more municipalities in the diocese. Each municipality has its own church council (}) and municipalities are made up of one or more parishes, each of which may contain one or more congregations. See each municipality below for lists of churches and parishes within them.

Bishops

References

External links
Kristiansand Cathedral panorama
 Diocese of Agder og Telemark website (Norwegian)

Christian organizations established in 1925
Agder og Telemark
Districts of Agder
Districts of Vestfold og Telemark
Organisations based in Kristiansand
1680s establishments in Norway